The blue-eyed triplefin, Notoclinops segmentatus, is a fish in the genus Notoclinops, commonly found around the North Island of New Zealand from depths of a metre to about 30 m, most common in reef areas of broken rock. Its length is between 3 and 6 cm and it is easily distinguished from other small fish by its iridescent blue eyes which give its name.  There are nine red vertical bars running right round the body, and an orange tinge to the back and head.

In the breeding season in winter the orange on the males becomes brighter on the head, tail, and anal fin. The rest of the body becomes blue/black.  Males set up nests in small depressions on vertical rock faces at depths of about 10 to 20 m where females are encouraged to lay their eggs.  The nest is then guarded.

The blue-eyed triplefin's diet includes small crustaceans (including amphipods and copepods), and has been known to remove parasites from larger fish. This fish count (at 2017) is 58.

References

 
 Tony Ayling & Geoffrey Cox, Collins Guide to the Sea Fishes of New Zealand,  (William Collins Publishers Ltd, Auckland, New Zealand 1982)

External links 

 Blue-eyed triplefin discussed on RNZ Critter of the Week, 2 Sep 2022

Blue-eyed triplefin
Endemic marine fish of New Zealand
Fish described in 1987